The Narcondam hornbill (Rhyticeros narcondami) is a species of hornbill in the family Bucerotidae. It is endemic to the Indian island of Narcondam in the Andamans. Males and females have a distinct plumage. The Narcondam hornbill has the smallest home range out of all the species of Asian hornbills.

Description

The sexes differ in plumage. The male has a rufous head and neck, black body and upper parts glossed with green. Females are all black. There is a bluish white throat patch and the tail is white in both sexes. Both sexes have a bill with a few folds on the upper side towards the base of the upper mandible. The skin around the eye is bluish. The iris of the male is orange red while the female has an olive brown with a pale yellow ring. The bill is waxy and the furrows of the casque are brownish. The bill is pinkish towards the base. The legs are black and the sole is yellow.

Taxonomy 
The species was described by Allan Octavian Hume in 1873. The Narcondam Hornbill is placed in the genus Rhyticeros which is found only in Asia. Molecular evidence suggests that hornbills originated in Africa. Closely related species include species like wreathed hornbill (Rhyticeros undulatus) and Blyth's hornbill (Rhyticeros plicatus).

Behavior

Vocalizations 
Adults have a ka- ka- ka call in flight and a ko ... kokoko..ko..kok.. kok.. call at the nest. The young in the nest produce feeble chew calls.

Diet and Ecology 
The hornbill is predominantly frugivorous. Based on seeds in the middens below nesting trees, the following food tree species were identified: Anamirta cocculus, Capparis sepiaria, C. tenera var. latifolia, Garuga pinnata, Amoora rohituka, Terminalia catappa, and Ixora brunniscens. Nine species of fruits were recorded in their diet in a later study: Caryota mitis, Myristica andamanica, Artocarpus chaplasha, Dillenia indica, Sideroxylon longipetiolatum, Syzygium cumini, Ficus scandens, Ficus glomerata, and Ficus sp. Like other hornbills, they also consume invertebrates and occasionally feed on small reptiles. They sometimes mob white-bellied sea eagles that fly too close. Being predominantly fruit eaters, they play an important role in the seed dispersal of figs and other plant species. Figs are important in the ecology of many other insular hornbill species and are a major factor determining the distribution patterns of hornbills in forests.

Reproduction 
The breeding period spans at least from February until April. The species nests in holes on the trunk or broken branches of large trees. The female remains concealed in the nest-cavity for the duration of egg-laying and chick-rearing. At this time, the female sheds her flight feathers and hence cannot fly. The male provides food for the female and chicks. Generally two offspring are raised by a breeding pair. Breeding birds are over four years of age and make up 46-53% of the population.

Birds have been maintained in captivity but have not been bred successfully. In 1972, S. A. Hussain visited Narcondam Island and captured two adult hornbills and their chicks. The two chicks were taken to Bombay after the male died during the voyage and the female escaped in Madras, never to be found again. The chicks grew and lived for about 6 years but with age, the female showed increasing aggression towards the male sibling, eventually injuring him so badly that he died.

Habitat and Distribution 

The bird is a resident of fairly open mixed forest that stretches over most of the island from sea level to about 700m. However most Narcondam Hornbill nests are found below 200m. For nesting and roosting, the bird prefers mature undisturbed forest with large trees. The favored nesting trees are Sideroxylon and Sterculia species.

The entire population (estimate of about 200 birds in 1905 and 1984) is restricted to the single island of Narcondam in the Andaman Island chain. The island is clothed in forests and rises to a height of about 2300 feet above sea level. It is largely devoid of human presence. The island is often hit by cyclonic storms in the Bay of Bengal. In 2000, an estimate of 434 birds was made for the population, with a density of 54 to 72 birds per square kilometre on the island, which has an area of about 6.8 square kilometres. A nest site density of 2.8 pairs per square kilometer has been estimated.

Conservation Status 
Some human presence on the island has been noted recently and Since 2009 the Narcondam hornbill has had a Conservation status of Vulnerable.

The island of Narcondam has in the past been largely unpopulated. Goats were introduced several times on the island in the past, and a visit in 1991 revealed that feral goats had proliferated around an old police outpost. In 2011 there was a proposal by the Indian Coast Guard to erect a radar station and a diesel power generation station for it on the island. This was opposed due to the threats of increased human activity and disturbance and the threat to a number of endemic island species, including the hornbill. The plan was finally cancelled by the Ministry of Environment and Forests in 2012. However, in the wake of the Chinese monitoring activity in Myanmar's neighbouring Coco Island, the nod for the listening station was granted in June 2014.

References

External links

http://ibcn.in/wp-content/themes/ibcn/pdf/DOWNLOADS_IBA%20Summary%20final.pdf

Could Rare Bird on Tiny Island Be India's Ecological Canary?
Ministry bats for endangered Island Bird
Worlds only 300 Narcondam hornbills threatened by radar facility off India.

Narcondam hornbill
Birds of the Andaman Islands
Narcondam hornbill
Endemic fauna of the Andaman Islands
Taxonomy articles created by Polbot